Peter I (Portuguese: Pedro I, ; 8 April 1320 – 18 January 1367), called the Just (o Justiceiro) or the Cruel (o Cruel), was King of Portugal from 1357 until his death. He was the third but only surviving son of Afonso IV of Portugal and his wife, Beatrice of Castile.

Early life
In 1328, Peter's father, Afonso IV arranged for the marriage of his eldest daughter, Maria, to Alfonso XI of Castile. However, soon after their marriage Alfonso began a long affair with the beautiful and newly widowed Leonor de Guzman. Maria bore Alfonso a son in 1334, who ultimately became Peter of Castile, but after the Castilian king refused to end his affair Maria returned home to Portugal in 1335.

Alfonso had been married once before, to his cousin's daughter, Constanza Manuel (granddaughter of James II of Aragon). Alfonso had the marriage annulled in 1327, after only two years, to clear the way for marriage to Maria. This angered his cousin Juan Manuel, Prince of Villena, a powerful Castilian aristocrat, and for two years Juan Manuel waged war against the Castilians - who had kept his daughter Constanza hostage - until Bishop John del Campo of Oviedo mediated a peace in 1329.

Afonso, now enraged by the infidelity and mistreatment of his daughter Maria, forged an alliance with Juan Manual by marrying his son and heir, Peter, to Constanza. When Constanza arrived in Portugal in 1340, Inês de Castro, the beautiful and aristocratic daughter of a prominent Galician family (with links albeit through illegitimacy, to the Portuguese and Castilian royal families), accompanied her as her lady-in-waiting.

Peter soon fell in love with Inês, and the two conducted a long love affair that lasted until Inês's murder in 1355. Constanza died in 1349, following childbirth complications. The scandal of Peter's affair with Inês, and its political ramifications, caused Afonso to banish Inês from court after Constanza died. Peter refused to marry any of the princesses his father suggested as a second wife; and the king refused to allow his son to marry Inês as Peter wanted. The two aristocratic lovers began living together in secret. According to the chronicle of Fernão Lopes, during this period, Peter began giving Inês's brothers, exiles from the Castilian court, important positions in Portugal and they became the heir-apparent's closest advisors. This alarmed Afonso. He worried that upon his death, civil war could tear the country apart, or the Portuguese throne would fall into Castilian hands, either as Juan Manuel fought to avenge his daughter's honor, or the de Castro brothers supported their sister. Peter claimed that he had married Inês against his father's orders. In any event, in 1355, Afonso sent three men to find Inês at the Monastery of Santa Clara-a-Velha in Coimbra, where she was detained, and they decapitated her in front of one of her young children. Enraged, Peter revolted against his father. Afonso defeated his son within a year, but died shortly thereafter, and Peter succeeded to the throne in 1357. The love affair and father-son conflict inspired more than twenty operas and many writers, including: the Portuguese national epic Os Lusíadas by Luís de Camões, the Spanish "Nise lastimosa" and "Nise laureada" (1577) by Jerónimo Bermúdez and 'Reinar despues de morir' by Luís Vélez de Guevara, as well as "Inez de Castro" by Mary Russell Mitford and Henry de Montherlant's French drama La Reine morte.

King of Portugal
Peter reigned for a decade, and is often confused with his Castilian nephew because of their identical nicknames. Fernão Lopes labels Peter "the Just" and said that the Portuguese king loved justice—especially the dispensing of it, which he enjoyed doing for himself. Inês' assassins received his harshest punishment: the three had escaped to Castile, but Peter arranged for them to be exchanged for Castilian fugitives residing in Portugal with his nephew, Peter of Castile. The Portuguese king conducted a public trial of Pêro Coelho and Álvaro Gonçalves in 1361. After finding them guilty of Ines' murder, the king ripped their hearts out with his own hands, according to Lopes, because of what they had done to his own heart. Diogo Lopes Pacheco escaped and died in 1383.
According to legend, Peter later had Inês' body exhumed and placed upon a throne, dressed in rich robes and jewels, and required all of his vassals to kiss the hand of the deceased "queen". However, contemporary evidence that the event occurred is minimal; Peter did have Inês' body removed from her resting place in Coimbra and taken to Alcobaça where it was reburied in the royal monastery. Peter had two tombs constructed, one for each of them, so they would see each other when rising at the Last Judgment. The tombs show Peter and Inês facing each other, with the words "Até o fim do mundo..." ("Until the end of the world...") inscribed on the marble.

Peter was also the father of Ferdinand I of Portugal and John I of Portugal. John was the Master of the military order of Avis, and he would become the founder of the Avis dynasty after the 1383–85 Crisis.

Marriage and descendants
Before his marriage to Constance, in 1329 he was betrothed to Blanche of Castile but because of her weak mental health and incapacity, the marriage never took place.

See also
Quinta das Lágrimas
Chronicle of the King D. Pedro I (by Fernão Lopes)

Notes

References

Bibliography

 
 
 

Portuguese infantes
House of Burgundy-Portugal
1320 births
1367 deaths
People from Coimbra
14th-century Portuguese monarchs
People with speech impediment
Sons of kings